Elmer C. "Ken" Cooper Jr. (October 12, 1936 – May 30, 2017) was an American football player and coach.  He served as the head football coach at the University of Mississippi from 1974 to 1977, compiling a record of 21–23.  Cooper was named the SEC Coach of the Year in 1975.

Cooper died on May 30, 2017 at his home in Skidaway Island, Georgia.

Head coaching record

References

1936 births
2017 deaths
American football ends
Georgia Bulldogs football coaches
Georgia Bulldogs football players
Ole Miss Rebels football coaches
High school football coaches in Georgia (U.S. state)
People from Tift County, Georgia